The 61st Anti-aircraft Missiles Regiment "Pelindava" (Regimentul 61 Rachete Antiaeriene) is an air defense regiment of the Romanian Land Forces. Its headquarters are located in Slobozia, Ialomița County. 

The regiment was part of the 6th Anti-aircraft Missile Brigade, which was disbanded in 2006, due to a reorganization process of the Romanian Land Forces. Later on, it was part of the 53rd Anti-Aircraft Missiles Regiment subordinated to the 1st Infantry Division. This unit operated the S-75 "Volhov" and the modern MIM-23 Hawk surface-to-air missile systems. 

The main units of the regiment were the 1st Anti-aircraft Missiles Battalion and the 2nd Anti-aircraft Missiles Battalion Pelendava. When Romania's divisions were reorganized and the 2nd Infantry Division was created from units previously belonging to the 1st and 2nd divisions, the Pelendava Battalion was raised to a regiment and kept with the 1st Division, while the 1st Anti-aircraft Missiles Battalion was transferred to the 2nd Division.

References

External links

   Official Site of the Romanian Land Forces
  Official Site of the 1st Territorial Army Corps

Regiments of Romania
Air defence units and formations of the Romanian Army
Military units and formations established in 1968